Goran Bošković (born 13 July 1966) is a Serbian former footballer who played as a forward.

Career
After starting out at Radnički Kovin, Bošković joined Yugoslav Second League club Proleter Zrenjanin in July 1983, shortly after his 17th birthday. He helped them win promotion to the Yugoslav First League in 1990. After scoring eight goals in the 1990–91 season, his first in the top flight, Bošković moved abroad to France and signed with Division 2 club Valenciennes. He was their top scorer in his debut season, helping them win promotion to the French Division 1. In 1993–94, Bošković briefly moved to Greece and played with Apollon Athens, before returning to France.

Honours
Valenciennes
 French Division 2: 1991–92

References

External links
 
 

1966 births
Living people
People from Kovin
Yugoslav footballers
Serbia and Montenegro footballers
Serbian footballers
Association football forwards
FK Proleter Zrenjanin players
Valenciennes FC players
Apollon Smyrnis F.C. players
Trélissac FC players
Angoulême Charente FC players
Yugoslav Second League players
Yugoslav First League players
Ligue 2 players
Ligue 1 players
Super League Greece players
Yugoslav expatriate footballers
Serbia and Montenegro expatriate footballers
Expatriate footballers in France
Expatriate footballers in Greece
Yugoslav expatriate sportspeople in France
Serbia and Montenegro expatriate sportspeople in France
Serbia and Montenegro expatriate sportspeople in Greece